Sergio González Soriano (born 10 November 1976), known simply as Sergio, is a Spanish football manager and former player. He is the manager of Cádiz and the Catalonia national team.

A hard-working central midfielder, he was adept at both defence and playmaking, and spent nearly one decade as a professional at Deportivo de La Coruña after starting at Espanyol. Over 14 La Liga seasons, he amassed totals of 418 matches and 34 goals. He represented Spain in the 2002 World Cup. 

Sergio started working as a coach in 2014, also with Espanyol.

Playing career

Club
Born in L'Hospitalet de Llobregat, Barcelona, Catalonia, Sergio started out at local CE L'Hospitalet, signing with neighbouring RCD Espanyol in 1995 and going on to spend nearly three years with its reserves in the Segunda División B. He made his La Liga debut on 10 April 1998 in a 2–0 home win against CD Tenerife, and was an undisputed starter the next three seasons, going on to total nearly 125 official appearances.

Looking for greater challenges, Sergio accepted a move to Deportivo de La Coruña in the summer of 2001. In his first year with the Galician team he played all 38 matches and scored four goals, as Depor finished runners-up and won the Copa del Rey – in the final, he opened the 2–1 victory over Real Madrid at their homeground as the opposing club was celebrating its 100th anniversary (the play was dubbed Centenariazo).

Sergio went on to only miss eight league matches over the following four seasons, making 383 competitive appearances during his stint. He only failed to find the net at least once in the 2009–10 campaign, in which he appeared in 24 games.

In mid-July 2010, after nearly one full decade with Deportivo, 33-year-old Sergio joined Levante UD, recently returned to the top flight. He was essential as the Valencians won in the fourth round of the season after three losses, scoring the only goal at UD Almería on 22 September. After several injury problems, he was released on 30 June 2011.

International
Sergio made his debut for Spain on 24 March 2001, coming on as a substitute for Pep Guardiola in a 5–0 win against Liechtenstein for the 2002 FIFA World Cup qualifiers. Selected for the finals in Japan and South Korea, he appeared in a 3–2 group stage defeat of South Africa, replacing David Albelda.

Since 1999, Sergio represented the Catalonia football team, making his debut on 23 December in a 1–0 friendly win with Yugoslavia and scoring his first goal nearly ten years later, in a 4–2 friendly against Argentina.

Coaching career

Club
Sergio started working as a manager in 2013, being in charge of Espanyol B. On 27 May 2014 he was named as the new coach of the first team, replacing Javier Aguirre after the latter's contract expired; sporting director Óscar Perarnau commented: "We are delighted with Sergio's personality and he knows the club perfectly. "He has little experience as a coach but everyone has to start one day and we believe he has what it takes".

On 14 December 2015, after a 1–0 away loss against RC Celta de Vigo, and even though the team was still several points clear of the relegation zone, Sergio was relieved of his duties. In his 62 games in charge, he collected 22 wins, 14 draws and 26 losses.

On 10 April 2018, after more than two years without a club, Sergio was appointed manager of Real Valladolid in the second tier. He managed to win eight of his first 12 matches, leading them to fifth place in the regular season and promotion in the play-offs.

In December 2019, with his contract due to expire the following summer, Sergio signed a new deal to keep him at Pucela until 2022. After relegation in May 2021, he was dismissed by chairman Ronaldo.

On 11 January 2022, Sergio replaced Álvaro Cervera at top-flight side Cádiz CF. In his first game four days later, the team advanced on penalties after a goalless draw away to Sporting de Gijón in the domestic cup, making the quarter-finals for the fourth time in their history and first since 2006.

International
Sergio also managed the Catalan national team, being appointed alongside Gerard López by the Catalan Football Federation in October 2015. On his debut on 26 December, the team lost 1–0 to their Basque counterparts in the Centenary Trophy.

Career statistics

Club

International

Scores and results list Catalonia's goal tally first, score column indicates score after each Sergio goal.

Managerial statistics

Honours
Espanyol
Copa del Rey: 1999–2000

Deportivo
Copa del Rey: 2001–02
Supercopa de España: 2002
UEFA Intertoto Cup: 2008

See also
List of La Liga players (400+ appearances)

References

External links

1976 births
Living people
Spanish footballers
Footballers from L'Hospitalet de Llobregat
Association football midfielders
La Liga players
Segunda División B players
CE L'Hospitalet players
RCD Espanyol B footballers
RCD Espanyol footballers
Deportivo de La Coruña players
Levante UD footballers
Spain international footballers
2002 FIFA World Cup players
Catalonia international footballers
Spanish football managers
La Liga managers
Segunda División managers
Segunda División B managers
RCD Espanyol B managers
RCD Espanyol managers
Real Valladolid managers
Cádiz CF managers